Chah Pir (also Romanized as Chāh Pīr, Chāh-e Pīr, and Chāh-i-Pīr; also known as Shāh Pīr) is a village in Ahram Rural District, in the Central District of Tangestan County, Bushehr Province, Iran. At the 2006 census, its population was 897, in 207 families.

References 

Populated places in Tangestan County